Rodina (Homeland) is a Russian political thriller television series developed by Pavel Lungin and Timur Weinstein, based on the Israeli series Hatufim, which was created by Gideon Raff. Rodina is a second adaptation of Hatufim, after the American version Homeland by Howard Gordon and Alex Gansa.

The series stars Viktoriya Isakova as Anna Zimina, a Federal Security Service (FSB) officer, and Vladimir Mashkov as Alexey Bragin, a  Russian Marine Corps sniper. Anna comes to believe that Alexey, who was held captive by Chechen terrorists as a prisoner of war, was "turned" by the enemy and threatens the Russian Federation.

The series was broadcast in the Russian Federation on channel Russia-1, and produced by WeiT Media. The first episode aired on March 16, 2015, and the last on March 26, 2015. The series was a ratings hit, with the premiere the network's highest-rated show in two years.

Overview
The series begins in 1993. Marine Colonel Alexey Bragin and sniper Yuri Khamzin go missing during a military operation in the North Caucasus.

Six years later, a joint force of the FSB's Alpha Group and Spetsnaz GRU raids a terrorist camp in the North Caucasus. Capturing a bunker, they find a bearded Colonel Bragin chained to a wall.  Bragin's liberation becomes a media event. Physically and psychologically exhausted by long years of torture and solitary confinement, Bragin begins working with doctors and psychologists, as well as Anna Zimina, an expert analyst from the FSB's Counterterrorism Center.

At the heart of the plot is a confrontation between Bragin, who is experiencing post-traumatic stress disorder and is suspected of recruiting terrorists, and Anna, the FSB officer assigned to investigate him.

Plot

1993. Anna Zimina is an FSB officer recently recalled from Beirut after angering the Lebanese government. Anna is liked and trusted by her mentor Mikhail Volskiy and tolerated by her boss Bagmet. During her assignment in Lebanon, she hearing a rumor from one of her contacts in Beirut that a Russian military officer has been "turned."

In 1999, Anna learns that a Russian Army Alpha Force team in Chechnya has found Russian Marine Corps major Alexey Bragin, who had been believed killed in 1993. While the rest of the FSB and the political establishment believe Bragin to be a war hero, Anna is worried that he has been recruited and brainwashed by Chechen chief Bin Jalid to act as a sleeper agent. She begins an illegal audio and video surveillance of Bragin's home hoping to catch him at something to prove her suspicions correct.

The surveillance reveals the difficulties Bragin has upon his return home. Believing him dead, his wife Yelena had developed a relationship with Bragin's younger brother Dmitry that beyond the affair, was moving towards Dmitry moving in with the family. Bragin must now adjust to life at home with his wife and two children, 12-year-old Vanya and the troubled and self-destructive 16-year-old Katya. His readjustment is complicated by his erratic behavior and his difficulty being physically intimate with his wife. Unbeknownst to his family or Anna, Bragin converted to Islam during his captivity, and prays daily in his storage in private. Flashbacks also show that he has not been entirely truthful about his captivity. However, the surveillance by Anna uncovers no incriminating evidence and is eventually shut down.

Frustrated, Anna decides to continue the surveillance all by herself. Anna and Alexey meet at a pub and get drunk. They meet again when one of Bragin's former jailers is captured and Bragin is brought in to observe the interrogation. Bragin convinces Bagmet to allow him to have a moment to confront his former jailer, but the meeting ends violently. Later, the prisoner is found to have committed suicide. Anna believes Bragin killed him. She arranges for polygraphs for all those who had access to the prisoner. Bragin passes, but Anna suspects he is lying when he is able to deny that he has been unfaithful to his wife.

Meanwhile, an asset of Anna's who works as a courtesan for a Qatari prince contacts Anna with photo of Bin Jalid meeting with the prince. Shortly afterwards, she is murdered and an expensive necklace given to her by the prince is stolen. Suspecting that the necklace is being used to fund a terrorist operation, the FSB tracks the funds to a local couple, who have purchased a home near the Kremlin. After being tipped off by an anonymous contact, they are go on the run where the husband is killed and the wife tries to escape to Estonia, where she is captured by Mikhail.

Bragin, having discovered that his wife was having an affair with his brother, meets Anna and they go to her family's lakefront cabin. They have sex, but Bragin becomes suspicious after Anna inadvertently says the brand name of the tea he usually drinks. Bragin finds a loaded gun in the house and confronts Anna, who admits her suspicions. Bragin admits to having been converted to Islam by Bin Jalid, whom he met while being held captive. He explains that Jalid was kind to him and that he came to "love" the terrorist leader, but denies working for Chechen terrorists. Anna receives a call from Mikhail, indicating that a woman has identified the terrorist as Yuri Khamzin, Bragin's Scout Sniper partner, who even Bragin had believed to be dead. Anna profusely apologizes to Bragin, claiming that she has real feelings for him, but he angrily returns to his family.

As the FSB begins tracking Yuri Khamzin, Bragin has a surprise meeting with the State Duma member, Oleg Basov, who recruits Bragin to join his Party. Bragin then makes contact with Bin Jalid, revealing that he really is, in fact, a terrorist and spy for the Chechen. Flashbacks show that Bragin had been taken out of captivity by Jalid in order to teach his son, Mussa, to speak Russian. Bragin came to love the boy and when he was killed in a Russian military attack, Bragin vowed revenge on his own country. Bragin meets with a local tailor who gives him a suicide vest. All seems to be going according to plan, but his odd behavior begins to worry his daughter.

Bragin is asked to attend an event where Oleg Basov will announce his intention to run for the presidency. At the event (taking part in the Red Square), Yuri Khamzin assassinates one of Basov's aides, forcing all the dignitaries, including Bragin, to flee into Lenin's Mausoleum. Realizing that Bragin is likely working with Khamzin, Anna attempts to contact the FSB. Bragin tries to detonate his suicide vest but it malfunctions. He repairs it and is about to try again when he receives a phone call from his daughter Katya, who begs him to come home. He is unable to go through with his mission. Meanwhile, a Spetsnaz unit finds Yuri Khamzin and shoots him to death. Later, Bragin meets with Anna, who apologizes for suspecting him of terrorism, he warns her to stay away from him and his family from now on.

Afterwards, Mikhail talks to doctor near the hospital room to prepare Anna for electroconvulsive therapy (ECT). The doctors begin the ECT, which induces a seizure in Anna.

Cast and characters
 Viktoriya Isakova as Anna Zimmina, an FSB analyst in the  FSB's Counterterrorism Center
 Vladimir Mashkov as Alexey Bragin, a retired Marines corps colonel who is rescued by Spetsnaz GRU after being held by Chechen terrorists as a prisoner of war for six years
 Sergei Makovetsky as Mikhail Volskiy as Anna's mentor
 Andrey Merzlikin as Oleg Basov, a member of the State Duma
 Yuri Yakovlev Sukhanov as Yuri Khamzin
 Maria Mironova as Elena, Bragin's wife
 Sophia Khilkova as Katya Bragina
 Vladimir Vdovichenkov as Dmitry Bragin
 Valeriu Andriuta – Bin Jalid

Broadcast
The series was produced by Timur Weinstien's WeiT Media Production company and the first episode was premiered on Monday, March 16, 2015, on Russia-1 Federal Channel.

Production
Filming began in February 2014 in Moscow and Moscow Oblast.

Episode list
{| class="wikitable plainrowheaders" width="100%" style="margin-right: 0;"
|-style="color:white"
! style="background: #2D5A88;"|No. inseries
! style="background: #2D5A88;"|No. inseason
! style="background: #2D5A88;"|Directed by
! style="background: #2D5A88;"|Written by
! style="background: #2D5A88;"|Original air date
|-

|}

Criticism 
Rodina earned high popularity with audiences. According to Newsweek, TV critics noted similarities with the plot and episode structure of the American adaptation Homeland, but also criticized the series for "failing to tackle major modern-day political themes." While Homeland criticized the US government and the use of force in civilian areas of war zones, Rodina avoided criticism directed at the Kremlin, which Newsweek reports is "because the television producers wish to avoid any retaliation or criticism from the Russian authorities."

References

External links
 
 Rodina on Channel Russia-1
 Russia Has Its Own Homeland, Move over, Afghanistan. Brody, or "Bargin," is in Chechnya this time, Author: Sarah Kaufman

Russia-1 original programming
2010s Russian television series
Homeland (TV series)
Thriller television series
Russian television series based on American television series
Films about the Federal Security Service
Russian crime television series
Russian Foreign Intelligence Service in fiction
Russian-language television shows
Espionage television series
Islam in fiction
Russian military television series
Serial drama television series
Terrorism in television
Television series set in the 1990s